Memorias (Memories) is a 1976 album by Camilo Sesto. The album was successful both in Spanish markets and in Argentina. Two singles, "Memorias" and "Sólo tú", topped the Spanish Top 40.

Track listing
Memorias
¿Qué será de ti?
Discretamente
Por amor
Sólo tú
Alguien
Sólo mía
No me quieras así
Brindo
Háblame

References

1976 albums
Camilo Sesto albums